Sebewa Township is a civil township of Ionia County in the U.S. state of Michigan.  As of the 2000 census, the township population was 1,202 and decreased to 1,171 at the 2010 census.

Communities
 Sebewa (or Sebewa Corners) is an unincorporated community at  straddling the boundary between Sebewa Township on the west and Danby Township on the east. On April 11, 1867, Pierce G. Cook, as an agent for Elizabeth Cornell of New Jersey, platted the portion of community in Danby with the name Cornell. Other plats were made on the Sebewa side and over time, the name reverted to Sebewa for the entire settlement.

History

Early settlers
The first permanent white settlers in the township were John F. Terrill, Charles W. Ingalls, and John Brown from Vermont, who arrived in 1838. An earlier settler by the name of Jones had arrived in 1836 with his wife, but did not remain in the area. Terrill located on section 25 and Ingall and Brown in section 36. In 1843, Terrill, along with Anson W. Halbert, built a sawmill on the Sebewa Creek, just west of "The Corners" located where the corners of four sections met along the eastern township line. Halbert had arrived in 1841 and married one of Terrill's daughters and carried out some trade at the Corners. 

Jacob Showerman had been to the area in 1836 looking for land and found only Jones in section 1. They lodged in the small one-room cabin of Terrill's along with Terrill's and that of William Hogle and his son-in-law John Brown. The twenty people in the four families passed four weeks together until a path to Showerman's property could be cut. Eleazer Brown settled on land he bought in section 26.

Rufus Goddard, who had moved west from Livingston County, New York, came to the area in 1837 and located land in Sebewa while his family remained in Lenawee County. Goddard, along with Benjamin D. Weld, who was to give some assistance to Goddard, were to come together to Sebewa. However, Weld was not ready to move and both families remained in Lenawee. Weld moved to Sebewa in 1843 and settled in the southwestern part of Sebewa.

Township organization
Sebewa Township was a part of Berlin Township until March 19, 1845, when it was created as a separate township. The first names proposed were "Charlestown", in honor of Charles W. Ingalls; and "Liberia", but Rufus Goddard suggested Sebewa, after Sebewa Creek, meaning little river.  The first township meeting was held at the home of Jacob Showerman, but no record of the meeting attendees or acts remains.

Post offices
A post office named "Sebewa" was established on January 24, 1851, with Benjamin Weld as the first postmaster. On April 14, 1854, the post office was moved from Weld's properties in the southwest part of the township to the Showerman settlement when Lucius Showerman was named postmaster. In 1857, the office moved to "The Corners". The name was changed to "Cornell" on July 8, 1861, but was changed back to Sebewa on February 16, 1881. The office was closed on November 15, 1913.

Geography

Demographics
As of the census of 2000, there were 1,202 people, 406 households, and 332 families residing in the township. There were 415 housing units at an average density of 11.6 per square mile (4.5/km). The racial makeup of the township was 98.34% White, 0.25% Native American, 0.08% Asian, 0.25% from other races, and 1.08% from two or more races. Hispanic or Latino of any race were 0.92% of the population.

There were 406 households, out of which 40.4% had children under the age of 18 living with them, 73.2% were married couples living together, 5.4% had a female householder with no husband present, and 18.2% were non-families. 15.3% of all households were made up of individuals, and 5.9% had someone living alone who was 65 years of age or older.  The average household size was 2.96 and the average family size was 3.30.

In the township the population was spread out, with 29.9% under the age of 18, 8.3% from 18 to 24, 31.3% from 25 to 44, 20.1% from 45 to 64, and 10.4% who were 65 years of age or older.  The median age was 34 years. For every 100 females, there were 101.0 males.  For every 100 females age 18 and over, there were 103.1 males.

The median income for a household in the township was $47,065, and the median income for a family was $52,125. Males had a median income of $36,719 versus $24,091 for females. The per capita income for the township was $17,774.  About 5.1% of families and 6.1% of the population were below the poverty line, including 7.2% of those under age 18 and 3.9% of those age 65 or over.

Notes and references

External links
 Sebewa Township Officials

Townships in Ionia County, Michigan
Grand Rapids metropolitan area
Townships in Michigan